The 1908–09 Illinois Fighting Illini men's basketball team represented the University of Illinois.

Regular season
The 1908–09 season witnessed the fourth coach in just four years to head up the university of Illinois Fighting Illini men's basketball team.  The only difference for this season, however; was that Herb V. Juul became the first coach to stay for more than one year. He also became the first former Fighting Illini player to head the Illinois basketball program, serving as captain of the 1906–07 team. The starting lineup for the team included captain H. J. Popperfuss and Carl P. Watson at the forward positions, Emmett V. Poston as the center, and a combination of Roy G. Rennacker, Louis S. Bernstein and Thomas E. Thompson at guard. The Illini finished their season with an overall record of seven wins and six losses with a conference record of five wins, six losses and a fourth-place finish in the Western Conference.

Roster

Source

Schedule
Source

|-
!colspan=12 style="background:#DF4E38; color:white;"| Non-Conference regular season
|- align="center" bgcolor=""

|-
!colspan=9 style="background:#DF4E38; color:#FFFFFF;"|Big Ten regular season

|-

References

Illinois Fighting Illini
Illinois Fighting Illini men's basketball seasons
1908 in sports in Illinois
1909 in sports in Illinois